The Cotati are a fictional alien race appearing in American comic books published by Marvel Comics. They are a highly intelligent species of telepathic plants.

Publication history

The Cotati first appeared in The Avengers #133 (May 1975) and were created by Steve Englehart and Sal Buscema.

Fictional history
Long ago, the Cotati were humanoid in form, with branches which served as rudimentary limbs enabling them slow travel, and a torso topped by a distinct head with a semi-human face featuring two eyes above what looked like a mouth. The Cotati later allowed evolution to strip them of their mobility while concentrated their efforts on developing telepathic abilities. As a result, the species legs, torso and head merged into a single trunk-like body which was rooted firmly to the ground, and their faces became increasingly less evident until eventually no trace of any facial features remained. Most Cotati now look like simple, unremarkable trees although some have more distinctive appearances which include faces.

The Cotati originated on Hala in the Pama star system in the Large Magellanic Cloud, the same planet as the warlike humanoid Kree race. Despite their aggressive nature, the Kree ignored the Cotati because they believed that all plants were beneath their notice. Approximately one million Earth years ago, Hala was visited by a starship from the Skrull empire (at that time, the Skrulls were a benevolent race). The Skrulls wished to include Hala in their empire and offered its inhabitants their knowledge and technology in exchange for their loyalty and Hala's resources. To avoid any dissension regarding which of the two races would represent Hala to them, the Skrulls proposed a test of worthiness in which equal numbers of Kree and Cotati would be taken to different uninhabited worlds and left there with complete supplies for one year. At the end of that period, whichever group had done the most with themselves would be adjudged the most worthy. Both races agreed to these terms and the Skrulls transported 17 Cotati to a barren moon in an unspecified solar system. The Skrulls then transported 17 Kree to Earth's Moon and provided them with an artificial atmosphere and rudimentary technology. The Kree used their time to build a gargantuan city. The Skrulls who came to retrieve the Kree were extremely impressed and the Kree felt confident that they would be victorious. However, upon returning to Hala, the Kree contestants were informed by their fellows that the other Skrulls (those who had retrieved the Cotati) were more impressed by their transformation of their barren moon into a park full of plant life. Enraged, the Kree decided to try and win by destroying their competitors. They quickly exterminated all of the Cotati, when the Kree informed the Skrulls of how they had solved the problem of Hala's representation to them. The outraged Skrulls reacted by promising to reject Hala forever, said Kree barbarians slaughtered the Skrull delegation as well and seized their starship and all of its tremendously advanced technology for themselves, to which they would use to arm for war against the Skrulls eons later.

While the fascistic Kree battled the Skrulls for millennia, radically warping a once-benevolent society into an ultra-militaristic state, on their own homeworld. Their act of genocide against the Cotati was not as complete as they had thought: a new generation of Cotati had sprung forth from seed pods dropped by the previous generation as they died. Unnoticed by the Kree, these new Cotati went into hiding and allowed themselves to evolve into an immobile species with greater telepathic abilities. Centuries later, the Cotati made contact with a small number of Kree who were members of a secretive pacifist sect and formed an alliance with them. A century later, these pacifist Kree were known as the Priests of Pama and their temples contained secret cellars in which the now even more evolved Cotati were safely hidden and kept alive. However, when the Supreme Intelligence exiled the Priests to a barren prison planet, the Cotati aided them by influencing a cosmic menace known as the Star-Stalker to choose that planet as his next meal. The Priests discovered a means of countering the threat and forced it to flee, as the Cotati had been confident they would do. The Priests begged an audience with the Supreme Intelligence to warn it of the Star-Stalker but the Supreme Intelligence suspected that they had created a fictitious threat so that they would be brought back to the safety of Hala, something it refused to ever allow. The Priests then proposed that they be allowed to protect the inhabited worlds of the cosmos by sending teams of two to those worlds to remain there like Sentries until needed. Since this plan would keep the dissidents away from Hala while terminating the cost of their upkeep on the prison planet, the Supreme Intelligence accepted this proposal and the Priests of Pama were freed to leave. Unbeknownest to anyone, each pair of Priests took with them a group of plants who were actually Cotati.

Almost all Cotati were smuggled away from Hala to settle in temples created and maintained by the Priests of Pama on out-of-the-way planets. Those few on Earth have played a role in the lives of various superheroes, including the Avengers and the Silver Surfer.

The artificial environment created for the competition between the Kree and the Cotati still stands; today it is known as the Blue Area of the Moon, and is the location of the dwelling of Uatu the Watcher; it was for several years also the location of the Inhumans' city of Attilan. The Blue Area is also the site of the first recorded "death" of the Phoenix Force during the now-classic Dark Phoenix Saga.

The eldest of Earth's Cotati resurrected and took possession of the Swordsman's body so as to mate with Mantis and father the Celestial Messiah named Sequoia.

In the "Road to Empyre," General G'iah and her daughters Alice, Ivy, and Madison broke into a lab and steal a Cotati sample as G'iah informs them how the Cotati were on Hala before the Kree-Skrull War as well as a Cotati's history of possessing Swordsman. They claim the sample in order to preserve the Cotati species. The eldest of Earth's Cotati still using the Swordsman's body and Sequoia have since reappeared on the Blue Area of the Moon after the oxygen-rich area was revitalized. They request the Avengers help to avoid another Cotati massacre by the Kree/Skrull Alliance. Thor was able to bring some storms into the Blue Area of the Moon to continue their growth. Sequoiah even hinted that Hulkling is heading up the Kree/Skrull alliance. Thanks to a rousing speech from Iron Man, the team all agreed to defend the Cotati and figure out the politics afterwards unaware that the Fantastic Four are already among the Kree/Skrull Alliance. It was then revealed that the Cotati have abandoned their peaceful nature and have started a goal to slaughter all animal life. This causes the Avengers and the Fantastic Four to work with the Kree/Skrull alliance to fight them. One of their invasions involved targeting Wakanda's Vibranium mounds while controlling She-Hulk with a Cotati. In order to annihilate the Cotati, R'Kill planned to use the Pyre which would cause the Sun to annihilate the Solar System. When Black Panther slays the Swordsman Cotati with the Sword of Space while also destroying the Death Blossom and R'Kill's plot to use the Pyre to annihilate the solar system are thwarted, Quoi and the Cotati surrender peacefully which the Kree and the Skrull accept. Quoi is taken away by Thor and She-Hulk. All the Cotati are gathered on the Blue Area of the Moon where the Avengers, the Fantastic Four, and the Kree/Skrull Alliance are. As the Cotati are released from their Vibranium bondage, Invisible Woman prevents Quoi from attacking his "uncle" Thor. Franklin Storm uses his powers to bring the Cotati to an uninhabited planet that is far from Midgard, Skrullos, and Hala where they won't be of any harm. Thor then uses the blessing of Gaea to make the barren planet filled with life. This was enough to appease Quoi as Thor takes Invisible Woman and Franklin back to the others. Once things are settled on the Moon, Nick Fury's Unseen form later analyzes the weapons the Cotati used and gets an idea on the ancient race that used them which leads to the sudden revival of Uatu the Watcher.

Known Cotati
 Ru'tuh-Baga – A Cotati that was operating in Genosha.
 Qqoi – A Cotati science minister that worked under Ru'tuh-Baga.
 Shi Qaanth – A Cotati spellcaster who fought Captain America in Arlington and later began the attack on Mexico City.
 Sequoia – Also known as "Quoi," Sequoia is the Celestial Messiah who is the result of a union between Mantis and an Elder Cotati that possessed Swordsman's corpse.
 Swordsman – The eldest Cotati possessed the corpse of Swordsman in order to father Quoi with Mantis. Killed by Black Panther using the Sword of Space.
 Trrunk – A Cotati priest at the Temple of Pama. He was killed by Va-Sohn.
 Veltri – A Cotati spellcaster who was operating in the Savage Land.

In other media
In Guardians of the Galaxy, a radio dispatcher orders seven cases of Cotati seeds before he's taken prisoner by Drax. 

In Avengers: Infinity War, Gamora says that Thor's muscles look like they are made of Cotati metal fibres.

References

External links
 Cotati at Marvel Wiki

Fictional plants
Large Magellanic Cloud in fiction
Marvel Comics plant characters
Marvel Comics telepaths